George da Silva (born August 8, 1971) is an Aruban football player. In 2000, he played for the Aruba national team.

References

1972 births
Living people
Aruban footballers
Association football forwards
SV La Fama players
Aruba international footballers